Refuge Engineer Wiltgen was a Brazilian Antarctic summer installation named after Engineer João Aristides Wiltgen, founder of the Brazilian Institute for Antarctic Studies. Established on 3 February 1985, the structure was located on Elephant Island, South Shetland Islands, Antarctica, and depended both logistically and administratively on Comandante Ferraz station. It was dismantled during the summer 1997/98.

See also
Research stations in Antarctica

References

Brazilian Antarctica
Outposts of the South Shetland Islands
Buildings and structures completed in 1985
Buildings and structures demolished in 1997
Outposts of Antarctica
1985 establishments in Antarctica
1997 disestablishments in Antarctica